Broomieknowe railway station served the town of Bonnyrigg, Midlothian, Scotland from 1867 to 1951 on the Esk Valley Railway.

History 
The station opened on 15 April 1867 by the Esk Valley Railway. The station was situated at the end of Leyden Park in front of the Bonnyrigg Health Centre. The station was originally called Bonnyrigg but the name was changed to Broomieknowe on 1 August 1868. The station was closed as a wartime economy measure and lost its passenger service from 1 January 1917. The closure was only temporary unlike other stations and reopened on 1 April 1919. The station never had any goods facilities and closed on 10 September 1951.

The station site has now been replaced by a Health Centre.

References

External links 

Disused railway stations in Midlothian
Former North British Railway stations
Railway stations in Great Britain opened in 1867
Railway stations in Great Britain closed in 1917
Railway stations in Great Britain opened in 1919
Railway stations in Great Britain closed in 1951
1867 establishments in Scotland
1951 disestablishments in Scotland
Bonnyrigg and Lasswade